Bertram Wallace (23 October 1880 – 1948) was an English footballer who played in the Football League for Stoke.

Career
Wallace was born in Stoke-upon-Trent, Staffordshire, and played local football for Stoke St Jude's before joining Football League club Stoke. He made his only League appearance against Sheffield Wednesday playing at outside-left in the First Division during the 1901–02 season. After Wallace left Stoke, he returned to local football with Stoke Town.

Career statistics

References

1880 births
1948 deaths
Footballers from Stoke-on-Trent
English footballers
Association football forwards
Stoke City F.C. players
English Football League players